

January
 January 7 - John Johnson, American basketball player
 January 11 - Monte Irvin, American baseball player
 January 23 - Bobby Wanzer, American basketball player and coach
 January 27 - Augusto Giomo, Italian basketball player

February
 February 4 - Dave Mirra, American BMX rider and racecar driver
 February 24 - Eddie Einhorn, American basketball television and radio executive
 February 26 - Andy Bathgate, Canadian ice hockey player

March
 March 3 - Sarah Tait, Australian rower
 March 7 - Bobby Johns, American racecar driver
 March 9 - Clyde Lovellette, basketball player
 March 23 - Joe Garagiola Sr., American baseball player and announcer
 March 24 - Johan Cruyff, Dutch football player and coach
 March 27 - Antoine Demoitié, Belgian cyclist
 March 28 - Daan Myngheer, Belgian cyclist

April
 April 7 - Carlo Monti, Italian athlete
 April 13 - Nera White, American basketball player
 April 19 - Estelle Balet, Swiss snowboarder
 April 23 - Attila Ferjáncz, Hungarian racecar driver
 April 29 - Don White, American racecar driver

May
 May 6 - Patrick Ekeng, Cameroonian football player
 May 14 - Christy O'Connor Snr, Irish golfer

June
 June 3 - Muhammad Ali, American boxer
 June 3 - Sten Lundin, Swedish motorcycle rider
 June 3 - Luis Salom, Spanish motorcycle rider
 June 10 - Gordie Howe, Canadian ice hockey player
 June 11 - Rudi Altig, German cyclist 
 June 15 - Hiroshi Minatoya, Japanese judoka
 June 22 - Roberto Lovera, Uruguayan basketball player
 June 28 - Pat Summitt, American basketball player and coach
 June 28 - Buddy Ryan, NFL coach
 June 29 - Jan Hettema, South African cyclist and racecar driver

July
 July 9 - Fritzi Schwingl, Austrian canoeist
 July 9 - Bill Guilfoile, American baseball executive
 July 16 - Nate Thurmond, American basketball player

August
 August 3 - Chris Amon, New Zealand racecar driver
 August 6 - Midget Farrelly, Australian surfer
 August 7 - Bryan Clauson, American racecar driver
 August 9 - Bill Alsup, American racecar driver
 August 14 - Yasumitsu Toyoda, Japanese baseball player
 August 15 - Stefan Henze, German canoeist and coach
 August 16 - João Havelange, Brazilian football executive
 August 24 – Nina Yeryomina, Russian basketball player
 August 26 - Anton Pronk, Dutch football player
 August 28 - Lennart Häggroth, Swedish ice hockey player

September
 September 7 - Bobby Chacon, American boxer
 September 8 - Hannes Arch, Austrian air racer
 September 17 - Bahman Golbarnezhad, Iranian para-cyclist
 September 23 - Frances Dafoe, Canadian figure skater
 September 24 - Mel Charles, Welsh football player
 September 25 - Arnold Palmer, American golfer
 September 25 - José Fernández, Cuban-American baseball player
 September 30 - Mike Towell, Scottish boxer

October

November
 November 1 - Sverre Andersen, Norwegian footballer
 November 28 - Chapecoense tragedy (over 60 players, executives and journalists)

December
 December 2 - Sammy Lee, American diver
 December 5 - Marcel Renaud, French kayaker
 December 7 - Paul Bert Elvstrøm, Danish yachter
 December 23 - Miruts Yifter, Ethiopian runner
 December 29 - Néstor Gonçalves, Uruguayan football player and coach

2016 in sports
2016 deaths